Maja Ognjenović (born 6 August 1984) is a Serbian volleyball player and the captain of the Serbia women's national volleyball team. With the national team, she won the gold medal at the 2011 European Championship, silver medal at the 2007 European Championship, bronze medal at the 2006 World Championship. She won the silver medal at the 2016 Rio Olympics. In 2018, she has won the gold medal at the 2018 FIVB Volleyball Women's World Championship. During the 2020 Tokyo Olympics, she has won the bronze medal.

Career
Ognjenović won a gold medal at the 2011 European League, also winning the Best Setter award with her national team. She repeated the individual Best Setter award as her team claimed the bronze medal in the 2012 European League. At the end of season 2017–18 of Turkish Women's Volleyball League, she transferred to Russian club WVC Dynamo Moscow. Currently, she plays her volleyball at Eczacıbaşı Dynavit.

Awards

Individual
 2007 European Championship "Best Setter"
 2008-09 CEV Challenge Cup Final Four "Best Setter"
 2010 European League "Best Setter"
 2011 European League "Best Setter"
 2011 European Championship "Best Setter"
 2012 European League "Best Setter"
 2013/14 Polish Cup - Best Setter
 2014-15 CEV Champions League - Best Setter
 2015 European Championship "Best Setter"
 2017-18 CEV Cup - Best Setter
 2017-18 Turkish Cup - Best Setter 
 2018/19 Russian Cup - Best Setter
 World Olympic Qualifications 2020 - Best Setter
 2019 European Championship "Best Setter"
 2020-21 Turkish Women's Volleyball League - Best Setter
 2021/22 CEV Cup - Best Setter
 2021/22 CEV Cup - MVP

National team

Senior team
 2007 European Championship -  Silver Medal
 2009 European League -  Gold Medal
 2010 European League -  Gold Medal
 2011 European League -  Gold Medal
 2011 European Championship -  Gold Medal
 2012 European League -  Bronze Medal
 2015 European Championship -  Bronze Medal
 2016 Summer Olympics -  Silver Medal
 2018 World Championship -  Gold Medal
 2019 European Championship -  Gold Medal
 2020 Summer Olympics -  Bronze Medal
 2021 European Championship -  Silver Medal

Universiade
 2009 Summer Universiade -  Silver Medal

Clubs
 2003/2004 Serbian Championship -  Champion, with Crvena Zvezda
 2006/2007 Romanian Championship -  Champion, with Metal Galati
 2007/2008 Romanian Championship -  Champion, with Metal Galati
 2008/2009 CEV Challenge Cup -  Champion, with Monte Schiavo Banca Marche Jesi
 2010/2011 Greek Cup -  Champion, with Olympiacos
 2013/2014 Polish volleyball league -  Champion, with Chemik Police
 2013/2014 Polish Cup -  Champion, with Chemik Police
 2014/2015 Polish volleyball league -  Champion, with Chemik Police
 2016 FIVB Club World Championship -  Champion, with Eczacıbaşı VitrA
 2016-17 CEV Champions League –  Bronze medal, with Eczacıbaşı VitrA
 2017-18 CEV Cup -  Champion, with Eczacıbaşı VitrA
 2018/19 Russian Cup -  Champion, with Dinamo Moscow
 2018/19 Russian Super Cup -  Champion, with Dinamo Moscow
 2018-19 Russian Super League -  Champion, with Dinamo Moscow
 2019 FIVB Club World Championship –  Bronze medal, with VakıfBank 
 2020 Turkish Super Cup -  Runner-Up, with VakıfBank S.K.
 2021 Turkish Cup -  Champion, with VakıfBank S.K.
 2020-21 CEV Champions League -  Runner-Up, with Vakıfbank S.K.
 2021-22 CEV Cup -  Champion, with Eczacıbaşı Dynavit
 2022 FIVB Club World Championship –  Bronze medal, with Eczacıbaşı Dynavit

References

External links
 FIVB profile

1984 births
Living people
Sportspeople from Zrenjanin
Serbian women's volleyball players
Olympiacos Women's Volleyball players
Eczacıbaşı volleyball players
Olympic volleyball players of Serbia
Volleyball players at the 2008 Summer Olympics
Volleyball players at the 2012 Summer Olympics
Volleyball players at the 2016 Summer Olympics
Olympic silver medalists for Serbia
Olympic medalists in volleyball
Medalists at the 2016 Summer Olympics
European champions for Serbia
Expatriate volleyball players in Greece
Expatriate volleyball players in Italy
Expatriate volleyball players in Poland
Expatriate volleyball players in Romania
Expatriate volleyball players in Turkey
Serbian expatriate sportspeople in Greece
Serbian expatriate sportspeople in Italy
Serbian expatriate sportspeople in Poland
Serbian expatriate sportspeople in Romania
Serbian expatriate sportspeople in Turkey
Universiade medalists in volleyball
Universiade silver medalists for Serbia
Medalists at the 2009 Summer Universiade
Volleyball players at the 2020 Summer Olympics
Olympic bronze medalists for Serbia
Medalists at the 2020 Summer Olympics